La Bouille is a commune in the Seine-Maritime department in the Normandy region in north-western France.

Geography
A ferry service crosses the river to Sahurs.

Population

Notable people
 Writer Hector Malot was born here in 1830.
 French actor Albert Lambert.
 La Bouille has been the subject of landscapes by Turner, Gauguin, Albert Lebourg, Robert Antoine Pinchon and Henri Vignet.

Places of interest

 
 The church of Sainte-Madeleine, dating from the sixteenth century.
 A sixteenth century salt warehouse.
 Several lesser buildings dating from the thirteenth century.
 The Château Albert Lambert.
 The seventeenth-century château de l'Ermitage

See also
Communes of the Seine-Maritime department

References

Communes of Seine-Maritime